Henri Häkkinen (born 16 June 1980, in Joensuu) is a Finnish sport shooter. He won the bronze medal in Men's 10m air rifle at the 2008 Summer Olympics. He was leading with Abhinav Bindra of India until the final shot. Bindra won gold with a last shot of 10.8, whereas Häkkinen could score only 9.7, thereby settling for a bronze. China's Zhu Qinan got the silver with a final shot of 10.5. Henri Häkkinen's manager is Finnish Sports Management Agency, SportElite.

Häkkinen has a master's degree in military science and he works as an officer at Signals Regiment in Riihimäki. His military rank is Major.

See also
 Shooting at the 2008 Summer Olympics – Men's 10 metre air rifle

External links
 Athlete bio at the official Olympics site
 Henri Häkkinen at SportElite's website

1980 births
Living people
People from Joensuu
Finnish male sport shooters
Olympic shooters of Finland
Shooters at the 2008 Summer Olympics
Olympic bronze medalists for Finland
Olympic medalists in shooting
Medalists at the 2008 Summer Olympics
Sportspeople from North Karelia